The Amalfinon Monastery (Greek: Μονή των Αμαλφηνών) or Amalfion was the most prominent of the three former monasteries for Latin speaking Christians on Mount Athos before the Great Schism and one of the first examples of Latin adherence to Eastern Orthodoxy after the events of 1054. It was located halfway between the Athonite monasteries of Great Lavra and Karakallou Monastery.

History 
Amalfinon was founded in the 10th century by monks from Amalfi, Italy. They followed the Rule of Saint Benedict and used Latin as their liturgical language.

The monastery was built between the years 985 and 990 by 7 Benedictine monks under the leadership of Leo the Elder, who was invited to build the monastic community by the Georgian Orthodox at the Iviron Monastery. The earliest Benedictine monastics associated with Amalfinon were close friends with Saint Athanasius of Athos, the founder of the Great Lavra. By the 12th century the Amalfinon Monastery, remaining loyal to Eastern Orthodoxy, flourished and was held in high esteem. Records on Mount Athos show that the Abbot of Amalfinon signed, in Latin, under the signature of the Abbot of the Great Lavra. 

The monastery was peacefully transferred to the Great Lavra in 1287 after suffering greatly from crusaders and being unable to repair the monastery buildings and replace monastics and clergy. The Holy Monastery of Amalfinon was turned over by Byzantine emperor Adronikos II Palaiologos to the hands of the Great Lavra Monastery.

The area surrounding the site, now called Morfonos or Amalfinos, as well as the ruins themselves, owe their names to the Monastery of Amalfinon, which was also called Morfonos. There are 5 monks of the Great Lavra tending the land around the area of Morfonos.

The monastery remained active until the 13th century, after the Great Schism in 1054. The area is still called Morfonos or Morfonou in Greek.

Affiliation of the monastery 
Holy Monastery of Amilfnon remained an Eastern Orthodox monastery on Mount Athos practicing the Latin Rite after the Great Schism and is one of the earliest examples of Latin Rite Orthodoxy. It has been suggested by some, such as Elene Metreveli, that the Monastery was affiliated with the Roman Catholic Church after the East-West Schism. However, multiple ecclesiastical scholars from the East have shown the praxis of Amalfi to have remained thoroughly Orthodox and have pointed out that expulsions of Latins from Orthodox territory had occurred before, such as the expulsion of Frankish monks from the Mount of Olives in 808 for using the filioque in the Creed, or the complete expulsion of all Latins from Constantinople in 1186. Amalfinon, remaining loyal to Eastern Orthodoxy, flourished and was supported by Athos and the Byzantines long after the schism, rising to the rank of 2nd signatory after the Great Lavra.

Notable monastics 
List of monks and abbots of, or connected with, Amalfion:

John and Arsenius, c. 984
Elder Leo the Roman, founder of the monastery with six disciples and help from the Georgians of Iviron, c. 985-990
John of Benevento of the monastery of Monte Cassino, c. 986-993
Abbot John III of Cassino, c. 986-993
Abbot John the Amalfitan and successors, c. 991-1035. It is unknown if all the signatories on the Athonite charters and registers from 991-1035 were the same Abbot John of Amalfitan or if there were multiple Abbots with the same name. In 1017, Abbot John signs 2nd in rank.
Abbot Benedict, now signing under Byzantine Imperial Patronage, 1081
Abbot Demetrius, Hegumen, 1083
Abbot Vito, 1087-1108
Abbot Manso or Mauro, 1169

See also 
 Church of Saint Mary of the Latins
 Benedict of Nursia

References

External links 
 Aidan Keller, Amalfinon: The Western rite monastery of Mt Athos
 The Benedictine Monastery of Saint Mary on Mount Athos
 О конфессиональной принадлежности афонских бенедиктинцев
 Амальфион: тайны и загадки бенедиктинского монастыря на Афоне
 Benedictine Monastery on Mount Athos (Saint Elizabeth Convent)
 Peer Reviewed Assessment of the Religious Affiliation of the Benedictine monks of Mount Athos and their adherence to Greek Orthodoxy from Tbilisi State University
 Saint Benedict on Mount Athos

Religious buildings and structures in Greece
Religious buildings and structures completed in the 990s
1287 disestablishments in Europe
Benedictine monasteries in Greece
Medieval Athos
Christian monasteries established in the 10th century
Roman Catholic monasteries in Greece
10th-century establishments in the Byzantine Empire
Amalfi